Emsworth railway station serves the small town of Emsworth, on the Hampshire side of the border between Hampshire and West Sussex, in southern England. It is located on the West Coastway Line which runs between Brighton and Southampton,  from Brighton.

History

Facilities
The station has a ticket office which is staffed throughout the week in the morning and early afternoon (06:40-13:15 Mon-Sat, 08:10-15:45 Sun). At other times, the station is unstaffed and tickets can be purchased from the self-service ticket machine during these times. The station also has toilets which are open when the station is staffed.

The station has passenger help points and seated areas on both platforms as a waiting room which is open when the station is staffed.

The station has a small cycle rack and a small (free) car park at the entrance which is operated by APCOA parking.

Step-free access is available to both the platforms at Emsworth.

Services
All services at Emsworth are operated by Southern using  and s.

The typical off-peak service in trains per hour is:
 1 tph to  via 
 2 tph to  via 
 1 tph to 
 2 tph to 

Former services
Until May 2022 one Great Western Railway service from Portsmouth Harbour to Brighton called at Emsworth.

Bus connections
The station is served by the Coastliner route 700 bus, operated by Stagecoach South which provides buses every 20 minutes between Bognor Regis, Chichester and Portsmouth.

References

External links

Emsworth
Former London, Brighton and South Coast Railway stations
Railway stations in Great Britain opened in 1847
Railway stations in Hampshire
DfT Category E stations
Railway stations served by Govia Thameslink Railway
1847 establishments in England